This is a list of Yoga mudras. In yoga, mudrās are used in conjunction with pranayama (yogic breathing exercises), generally while seated in Padmasana, Ardhasiddhasana, Sukhasana or Vajrasana pose, to stimulate different parts of the body and mind, and to affect the flow of prana in the body.

Hasta
Hasta mudras (hand mudras) may be conducive for meditation, and help in internalization. Many hand mudrās evolved for use in rituals, especially within tantra. Others developed as iconographical symbols for depictions of deities in statues and paintings. Others were developed for non-verbal story telling in traditional dance. In the Hevajra Tantra hand mudrās are used to identify oneself to the goddesses at different holy sites.

Māna

Māna mudras (head mudras) are an important part of Kundalini yoga, and many are important meditation techniques in their own right.

Kaya

Kaya mudras (postural mudras) combine physical postures with breathing and concentration.

Bandha

Bandha mudras (lock mudras) are a type of mudra performed on the three diaphragms (respiratory, vocal, and pelvic). They are used in conjunction with holding the breath (kumbhaka) during pranayama.

Adhara

Adhara mudras (perineal mudras) are performed on the pelvic floor area and often relate to harnessing sexual energy.

See also
 List of mudras (dance)
 List of gestures

References

Further reading

External links

Mudras